Rog-Izmaylovsky is a rural locality (a khutor) in Krasnokorotkovskoye Rural Settlement, Novoanninsky District, Volgograd Oblast, Russia. The population was 336 as of 2010. There are 7 streets.

Geography 
Rog-Izmaylovsky is located on the Khopyorsko-Buzulukskaya Plain, on the Rog Leka, 19 km northeast of Novoanninsky (the district's administrative centre) by road. Alsyapinsky is the nearest rural locality.

References 

Rural localities in Novoanninsky District